Seyyed Mahmoud Alizadeh-Tabatabaei is an Iranian lawyer. According to the New York Times, he is "one of the most influential" and "well connected" lawyers to highest leaders in Iran. He was a member of City Council of Tehran fRom 1999 to 2003.

He is well known as one of the attorneies for the Hashemi Rafsanjani family. Alizadeh-Tabatabaei has also represented Mir-Hossein Mousavi, Zahra Rahnavard, Amir Hekmati, Saeed Malekpour, Ghoncheh Ghavami and Mohammad Ali Taheri among others.

References 

 Biography at City Council of Tehran website
 Interview with Shargh daily

1953 births
Living people
20th-century Iranian lawyers
Tehran Councillors 1999–2003
People from Isfahan Province
Imperial Iranian Air Force personnel
Executives of Construction Party politicians
21st-century Iranian lawyers